The Nashville Sounds Minor League Baseball team has played in Nashville, Tennessee, since being established in 1978 as an expansion team of the Double-A Southern League. They moved up to Triple-A in 1985 as members of the American Association before joining the Pacific Coast League in 1998. The team was placed in the Triple-A East in 2021 prior to this becoming the International League in 2022. In the history of the franchise, numerous players and teams have set records in various statistical areas during single games, entire seasons, or their Sounds careers.

Of the nine Sounds who hold the 19 career records tracked by the team, Tim Dillard holds the most, with seven. He is followed by Skeeter Barnes and Chad Hermansen, with three each; and Keith Brown, Mark Corey, Hugh Kemp, Otis Nixon, Tike Redman, and Joey Wendle, with one apiece. Dillard holds the most franchise records, with eight. He is followed by Jamie Werly, with six; and Steve Balboni and Skeeter Barnes, who hold four records each.

Combined, the team and individual players hold 30 league records: 13 in the Southern League, one in the American Association, and 16 in the Pacific Coast League. Individual players hold five Southern League, one American Association, and two Pacific Coast League records. The franchise set the Southern League season attendance record in 1980 and the single-game attendance record in 1982. Many of the Pacific Coast League records were set on May 5–6, 2006, when the Sounds participated in a 24-inning game against the New Orleans Zephyrs, which matched the longest game, in terms of innings played, in the league's history.

Key

Individual career records
These are records of players who lead in distinct statistical categories over their careers with the Sounds.

Career batting

Career pitching

Individual single-season records
These are records of individual players who lead in distinct statistical categories over a single season.

Single-season batting

Single-season pitching

Individual single-game records
These are records of individual players who lead in distinct statistical categories for a single game.

Single-game batting

Single-game pitching

Team season records
These are records of Sounds teams with the best and worst performances in distinct statistical categories over a single season.

Season general

Season batting

Season pitching

Season fielding

Team single-game records
These are records of Sounds teams which lead in distinct statistical categories for a single game.

Single-game batting

Single-game pitching

Attendance records

These are records of attendance at Sounds home games. The team originally played at Herschel Greer Stadium from 1978 to 2014. They have played at First Horizon Park since 2015.

Miscellaneous records
These are records of individual players and Sounds teams that do not fit into any of the preceding categories.

Individual

Team

Notes

References
Specific

General

Records